Hongeois of Korean origin and refers to two aspects of skates:

 Hongeo-hoe , a dish made from fermented skate
 Hongeo (fish), a monotypic genus containing only the Korean skate, Hongeo koreana